European route E 606 is a European B class road in France, connecting the cities Angoulême and Bordeaux.

Route 
 
 E603 Angoulême
 E05, E70, E72 Bordeaux

External links 
 UN Economic Commission for Europe: Overall Map of E-road Network (2007)
 International E-road network

Roads in France